Phasmatographa is a genus of moths of the family Yponomeutidae.

Species
Phasmatographa neurotypa - Meyrick, 1928 

Yponomeutidae